Gyárfás is a Hungarian surname. Some known people bearing this name are:

 András Gyárfás, Hungarian mathematician
 Jenő Gyárfás, Hungarian painter

See also
 Gyárfás-patak, the Hungarian name for the Ghiorfaş Creek, a tributary of the Mureș river in Romania
 Ileana Gyarfaş, Romanian gymnast